Grothusenkoog is a municipality in the district of Nordfriesland, in Schleswig-Holstein, Germany.

See also
 Eiderstedt Peninsula

References

External links 

Municipalities in Schleswig-Holstein
Nordfriesland